Ōwhiro Bay is a southern suburb of Wellington, New Zealand, that overlooks Cook Strait. It is situated west of the larger suburb of Island Bay.
The official name of the suburb was changed from Owhiro Bay to Ōwhiro Bay (with macron) by the New Zealand Geographic Board on 21 June 2019. The Bay and stream are named after the navigator Whiro, who landed the waka Nukutere there, and has been historically settled by the Kati Mamoe, Ngati Ira and Ngai Tara tribes.

The suburb has been an industrial area of southern Wellington since the 1950s with the opening of Bata Shoes and the Southern Landfill (1976).

Demographics 

Ōwhiro Bay had a population of 1,998 at the 2018 New Zealand census, an increase of 105 people (5.5%) since the 2013 census, and an increase of 174 people (9.5%) since the 2006 census. There were 687 households. There were 993 males and 1,005 females, giving a sex ratio of 0.99 males per female. The median age was 37.9 years (compared with 37.4 years nationally), with 405 people (20.3%) aged under 15 years, 363 (18.2%) aged 15 to 29, 1,032 (51.7%) aged 30 to 64, and 201 (10.1%) aged 65 or older.

Ethnicities were 74.6% European/Pākehā, 12.2% Māori, 7.1% Pacific peoples, 16.8% Asian, and 3.8% other ethnicities (totals add to more than 100% since people could identify with multiple ethnicities).

The proportion of people born overseas was 29.7%, compared with 27.1% nationally.

Although some people objected to giving their religion, 49.2% had no religion, 31.4% were Christian, 3.9% were Hindu, 0.5% were Muslim, 3.3% were Buddhist and 4.4% had other religions.

Of those at least 15 years old, 603 (37.9%) people had a bachelor or higher degree, and 192 (12.1%) people had no formal qualifications. The median income was $42,500, compared with $31,800 nationally. The employment status of those at least 15 was that 948 (59.5%) people were employed full-time, 213 (13.4%) were part-time, and 66 (4.1%) were unemployed.

Education
Ōwhiro Bay School is a coeducational state contributing primary (years 1–6) school. It has a roll of  students as of

References

External links

 Owhiro Bay School

Suburbs of Wellington City
Bays of the Wellington Region